Sarah Louise "Sadie" Delany (September 19, 1889 – January 25, 1999) was an American educator and civil rights pioneer who was the subject, along with her younger sister, Elizabeth "Bessie" Delany, of the New York Times bestselling oral history biography, Having Our Say: The Delany Sisters' First 100 Years, by journalist Amy Hill Hearth. Sadie was the first African American permitted to teach domestic science at the high-school level in the New York public schools. With the publication of the book about the sisters, she became famous at the age of 103.

Biography
Delany was the second-eldest of ten children born to the Rev. Henry Beard Delany (1858–1928), the first black person elected Bishop of the Episcopal Church in the United States, and Nanny Logan Delany (1861–1956), an educator. Rev. Delany was born into slavery in St. Mary's, Georgia. Nanny Logan Delany was born in a community then known as Yak, Virginia, seven miles from Danville.

Sadie Delany was born in what was then known as Lynch Station, Virginia, at the home of her mother's sister, Eliza Logan. She was raised on the campus of St. Augustine's School (now University) in Raleigh, North Carolina, where her father was the Vice-Principal and her mother a teacher and administrator. Delany was a 1910 graduate of the school. In 1916, she moved to New York City, where she attended Pratt Institute in Brooklyn, then transferred to Columbia University where she earned a bachelor's degree in education in 1920 and a master's of education in 1925. She was a New York City schoolteacher until her retirement in 1960. She was the first black person permitted to teach domestic science on the high school level in New York City. 

Delany died at the age of 109 in Mount Vernon, New York, where she resided in the final decades of her life. She is interred at Mount Hope Cemetery in Raleigh, North Carolina.

The Delany Sisters

In 1991, Delany and her sister Bessie were interviewed by journalist Amy Hearth, who wrote a feature story about them for The New York Times ("Two 'Maiden Ladies' With Century-Old Stories to Tell"). A New York book publisher read Hearth's newspaper story and asked her to write a full-length book on the sisters. Ms. Hearth and the sisters worked closely for two years to create the book, an oral history called Having Our Say: The Delany Sisters' First 100 Years, which dealt with the trials and tribulations the sisters had faced during their century of life. The book was on The New York Times bestseller lists for 105 weeks. It spawned a Broadway play in 1995 and a television film in 1999. Both the play and film adaptations were produced by Judith R. James and Dr. Camille O. Cosby. 

In 1994, the sisters and Hearth published The Delany Sisters' Book of Everyday Wisdom, a follow-up to Having Our Say. After Bessie's death in 1995 at age 104, Sadie Delany and Hearth created a third book, On My Own At 107: Reflections on Life Without Bessie.

Her siblings were:
 Lemuel Thackara Delany (1887–1956)
 Annie Elizabeth ("Bessie") Delany (1891–1995)
 Julia Emery Delany (1893–1974)
 Henry Delany, Jr. (1895–1991)
 Lucius Delany (1897–1969)
 William Manross Delany (1899–1955)
 Hubert Thomas Delany (1901–1990)
 Laura Edith Delany (1903–1993)
 Samuel Ray Delany (1906–1965)

Delany was the aunt of science fiction writer Samuel R. Delany Jr., the son of her youngest brother. Living Relative Families:
Delany, Mickey, Stent, and Graham Families

Sources

Further reading

References

External links

 
 
 
 
 Sarah Louise Delany at Library of Congress Authorities —with 7 catalog records

1889 births
1999 deaths
Activists for African-American civil rights
African-American writers
American writers
American centenarians
American Episcopalians
American women's rights activists
Pratt Institute alumni
People from Campbell County, Virginia
Writers from Raleigh, North Carolina
Writers from Mount Vernon, New York
St. Augustine's University (North Carolina) alumni
African-American Episcopalians
Episcopalian families
Teachers College, Columbia University alumni
Delany family
Activists from New York (state)
Activists from North Carolina
African-American centenarians
Women centenarians